Paolo Yrizar Martín del Campo (born 6 October 1997) is a Mexican professional footballer who plays as a forward for Liga MX club Querétaro, on loan from Guadalajara.

International career

Youth
Yrizar was called up for the 2017 FIFA U-20 World Cup.

Yrizar was called up by Jaime Lozano to participate with the under-22 team at the 2019 Toulon Tournament, where Mexico won third place at the tournament. He was called up by Lozano again to participate at the 2019 Pan American Games, with Mexico winning the third-place match.

Senior
Yrizar made his senior national team debut under manager Gerardo Martino on 2 October 2019 in a friendly against Trinidad & Tobago. He started the game and was substituted in the 63rd minute. One of his shots hit the goalpost.

Career statistics

International

Honours
Querétaro
Copa MX: Apertura 2016
Supercopa MX: 2017

Mexico U23
Pan American Bronze Medal: 2019

References

External links
 
 Debut Paolo Yrizar at Liga MX 
 Paolo Mexican Selection 
 

Living people
1997 births
Mexican footballers
Mexico international footballers
Mexican people of Basque descent
Association football forwards
Querétaro F.C. footballers
Liga MX players
Liga Premier de México players
Pan American Games medalists in football
Pan American Games bronze medalists for Mexico
Footballers at the 2019 Pan American Games
Footballers from Querétaro
Sportspeople from Querétaro City
Mexico under-20 international footballers
Medalists at the 2019 Pan American Games